Hurricane Emily was a powerful early season Cape Verde hurricane that caused significant damage across the Caribbean to Mexico. It was also the earliest-forming Category 5 Atlantic hurricane on record in a season and the most intense to form before August. At the time, Emily was the earliest-forming fifth named storm in the Atlantic on record; this record has since been surpassed by 2020's Tropical Storm Edouard, and again the following year by 2021's Hurricane Elsa. After forming on July 10, 2005, the storm moved through the central Atlantic Ocean before passing through the Windward Islands on July 14. Tracking generally towards the west-northwest, the storm gradually intensified as it traversed the Caribbean, peaking as a Category 5 hurricane on July 16, marking the earliest date for a storm to do so during the course of a given year. The system subsequently made landfall in the Yucatán Peninsula as a Category 4. Quickly crossing the peninsula, Emily emerged into the Gulf of Mexico and reorganized. On July 20, the storm struck Tamaulipas as a major hurricane and rapidly dissipated within 24 hours. The storm caused significant damage along its path, with up to $1.01 billion (2005 USD) in damages recorded, primarily in Mexico. 5 people died in each of Jamaica, Haiti, and Mexico; 2 people died elsewhere, for a total of 17 fatalities. Emily is the costliest Category 5 storm to not have its name retired.

Meteorological history

On July 6, a tropical wave moved off the coast of Africa. Moving westward, the disturbance gradually organized until July 10, at which point convection became more concentrated, and it is estimated Tropical Depression Five formed in the central tropical Atlantic that evening. Late on July 11, it strengthened and was named Tropical Storm Emily. Initially forecast to strengthen rapidly and move west-northwest through the Greater Antilles, Emily instead moved almost due west toward the Windward Islands, remaining a moderate tropical storm. The storm languished while moving quickly west, and struggled with maintaining its form. Contrary to the normal occurrence that hurricanes leave a cold wake behind, Hurricane Dennis had made portions of the Caribbean warmer, and therefore more favorable for tropical cyclone development. Late on July 13, Emily strengthened rapidly and reached hurricane strength while passing north of Tobago and entering the eastern Caribbean. On July 14, Emily made landfall in northern Grenada with  winds.

The intensification trend picked up again the next day with a fairly rapid drop in the storm's central pressure as it entered the southeastern Caribbean Sea, a region typically unfavorable for intensification. Hurricane Emily's winds increased in reaction, briefly bringing the storm to Category 4 strength early on July 15. During the day, the storm's strength fluctuated greatly, dropping to a Category 2 storm before reintensifying to a Category 4. Initially at this point Emily was thought to have peaked as a Category 4 storm, but the post-storm analysis showed it was indeed a Category 5 hurricane. Unrelated to Emily, Typhoon Haitang developed and intensified into a Category 5-equivalent super typhoon around the same time Emily intensified into a Category 5 hurricane, marking the first time since Typhoons Ivan and Joan in 1997 when two tropical cyclones of Category 5 strength existed simultaneously in the Northern Hemisphere. The storm weakened slightly as it continued westward, and remained a Category 4 while passing south of Jamaica and, on July 17, the Cayman Islands. Emily continued on its nearly straight track to the west-northwest, weakening somewhat but remaining at Category 4 strength until striking Cozumel just before mainland landfall at Playa del Carmen at 06:30 UTC on July 18.

The center of circulation emerged over the Gulf of Mexico later that morning. However, several hours over the warm waters of the western Gulf provided the energy needed for Emily to regenerate, and by midnight wind speeds were increasing. The increase in wind speed stalled, but the storm continued to become better organized. Emily started to show very symmetrical outflow, but the hurricane's strongest winds were being found at three different distances from the center. However, the outer wind radii subsided in the end, and the inner core prevailed. The result was a rapid strengthening of the inner core on the evening of July 19.

Further strengthening was expected by forecasters, but did not come. The storm's motion slowed, and the center began wobbling erratically toward the coast. The storm made landfall around 11:00 UTC on July 20 near San Fernando in Tamaulipas. After heading inland over northeast Mexico, it dissipated over the Sierra Madre Oriental on July 21.

Preparations

Eastern Caribbean
Still recovering from Hurricane Ivan a year prior, which damaged or destroyed approximately 90 percent of housing, residents in Grenada took quick action to prepare for Emily including declaring a state of emergency. A shortage of construction material stagnated rebuilding after Ivan. This left fewer buildings as reliable shelters and many homes without roofs by the arrival of Emily. Of the 80 buildings considered for public shelters, 45 were used as such with 1,650 people seeking refuge in them. Residents rushed to stock up on emergency supplies, resulting in heavy road traffic. The International Federation of Red Cross And Red Crescent Societies (IFRC) described residents to be in "panic"; grocery stores were emptied and stretches of cars lined at gas stations. The Grenada Red Cross Society affirmed their stockpile of 2,000 jerry cans, 600 blankets, 100 tarps, 50 cots, and 10 generators. They also coordinated evacuations with local transportation services. The nation's government enacted a curfew from 7:00 p.m. July 14 to 6:00 a.m. July 15 local time. Telecommunication services Cingular and Digicel suspended service as a precaution.

In the easternmost Caribbean Island of Barbados, the government ordered the closure of businesses while residents stocked up emergency supplies. Shelters were opened nationwide and local radio stations broadcast regular warnings to alert the public. A delegate from the Panama Regional Delegation was sent to assist the local chapter of the Red Cross. The Dominica Red Cross Society confirmed emergency resources were properly stockpiled. Trinidad and Tobago activated its National Emergency Centre and ordered the closure of commerce. Approximately 544 people sought refuge in shelters across Trinidad and Tobago. BP evacuated all but 11 essential workers from their 14 oil platforms around the nation. Businesses shuttered across St. Vincent and the Grenadines and St. Lucia. Although airports remained open, British Airways cancelled flights to and from Hewanorra International Airport. The St. Lucia Red Cross placed ten response teams on standby. The Antigua and Barbuda Red Cross placed 100 personnel on standby. The Pan American Disaster Response Unit (PADRU), already prepping its response to Hurricane Dennis, allocated supplies for the anticipated effects of Emily.

In Venezuela, a few oil tankers were forced to remain at Puerto la Cruz. Some flights were cancelled or delayed as early as July 12. Residents were alerted to the possibility of floods and mudslides. A red alert was issued for Aragua and 100 personnel were deployed to coastal communities. People living or visiting the Los Roques Archipelago were advised to remain sheltered in their homes. Conditions were considered safe by July 15 and activities returned to normal. Alerts were also raised for the nearby islands of Aruba, Bonaire, and Curaçao.

Greater Antilles
Recently impacted by Hurricane Dennis, concerns were raised of further damage in Jamaica especially with soils already saturated. In the former nation, PADRU requested immediate shipment of relief supplies, particularly hygiene kits and plastic tarps. The Jamaica Red Cross moved supply stockpiles originally intended for Dennis-related relief to southern areas of the island in preparation for Emily. The nation's Office of Disaster Preparedness and Emergency Management advised residents to check their disaster supply kits, ensure their property was secured, and be prepared to evacuate. Fishermen, especially those out by the Morant Cays and Pedro Bank, were advised to return to port. Prime Minister P. J. Patterson ordered J$100,000 be made available for each of the nation's constituencies. A further J$250,000–300,000 would be allocated for the activation of public shelters. Thousands of people were evacuated from coastal communities, including all of Port Royal and many from Portmore. Government offices were closed beginning on July 15 and local businesses were advised to do the same. Upon the onset of the storm, a total of 3,269 people were utilizing public shelters.

On July 14, residents of the Cayman Islands were alerted to the potential effects of Emily. The following day shelters were opened across the territory: all but one on Grand Cayman, two on Cayman Brac, and one on Little Cayman. Owen Roberts and Charles Kirkconnell International Airports shut down for the duration of the hurricane. Water Authority - Cayman shut down services starting the night of July 16 with utilities to be reactivated after the storm. The territory's government enacted a curfew and warned all residents that emergency services would not be responding to calls during the storm.

Already severely impacted by Hurricane Dennis, alerts were raised for four departments in Haiti on July 15: Grand'Anse, Ouest, Sud, and Sud-Est. In neighboring Dominican Republic, storm alerts were issued for the towns of Baní and Pedernales.

Mexico
On July 15, the Mexican Red Cross began preparations for potential impact from Emily. The agency transported  of supplies, rescue vehicles, communication teams, and pantry trailers to the Yucatán Peninsula. Supermarkets in Mérida were packed with residents stocking up on supplies. Officials in the state of Yucatán opened 1,118 shelters. Emergency services prepped response units for medical needs. State authorities in Campeche prepared 624 shelters with a collective capacity of 85,000 persons. A state of alert was raised for Veracruz, prompting the readying of shelters. Considered an "extremely dangerous" storm, with a trajectory mirroring Hurricane Gilbert in 1988, the highest level of alert was issued for the states of Yucatán and Quintana Roo on July 17. Residents in these areas were advised to stockpile supplies, board up their homes, and shelter in sturdy structures; travel during the storm was advised against. In response to this, "massive" evacuations began that day. With the region being a tourist destination, an estimated 120,000 people were visiting at the time of Emily's approach. Local officials ordered the evacuation of 85,000 people, and the complete relocation of guests at beach hotels in Cancún. An estimated 60,000 people were relocated to gymnasiums, hotels, and schools farther inland. Some hotels packed 15 people into a single room. Approximately 2,000 tourists from three hotels locked inside a gymnasium without air conditioning or fans by soldiers. On July 16, Cancún International Airport saw 340 departing flights, 100 more than normal. The Mexican military mobilized in preparation for rescue operations.

Numerous oil platforms owned by Pemex in the Gulf of Mexico were evacuated—approximately 15,800 workers—and two ports used for crude oil exports were closed. Two pilots died during the evacuation process when their helicopter crashed amid high winds.

Hotel guests were evacuated on Saturday afternoon, and staff on Sunday afternoon. Though some hotel guests in second floor rooms and above were given the option to be bussed into the center of Cancún to safe houses and shelters or to stay and wait out the storm in only the modern built hotels and resorts. Most of the remaining guests were restricted to their rooms and were not allowed out on the beach areas. No alcohol was sold in Cancún for 36 hours prior to the arrival of the storm, in an attempt to avoid drunken tourists being injured during the night. A German resident was electrocuted on his roof in Playa del Carmen while preparing for the storm.

Elsewhere
On July 15, Belize's National Emergency Management Organization (NEMO) initiated its preliminary phase of preparedness. An all-clear was issued for the nation as Emily traversed the Yucatán Peninsula on July 18. The Costa Rican National Meteorological Institute advised residents in high risk areas to be alert and to avoid venturing outside in the event of rainfall. Similarly, Defensa Civil de Cuba reminded people to remain vigilant.

United States
Early fears of Emily's potential disruption to oil production contributed to a one dollar rise in prices by July 13, bringing the cost of a barrel over US$60. Emergency management officials in Escambia County, Florida, became wary of Emily's formation on the heels of Hurricane Dennis. Although the storm was expected to remain in the Caribbean, county officials identified supplies used for Dennis-related relief; an influx of fuel was expected to normalize reserves before any potential impact. On July 17, the American Red Cross began preparations to open shelters and had emergency supplies deployed for rapid distribution in South Texas.

Impact

Caribbean

In Barbados, damaging winds downed trees and tore the roof off two homes. Rivers in the country's capital, Port of Spain, and across central Tobago topped their banks; many roads were inundated. Thirty people required evacuation in Chaguanas. Flooding in Couva left Caparo Village temporarily isolated. At least 16 homes lost their roof and 2 collapsed amid gusty winds. Approximately 40 percent of residences—15,630 Trinidad and Tobago Electricity Commission customers: 11,000 in Trinidad and 4,330 in Tobago—lost power and communications were temporarily lost with a town in the northern part of the country. In San Juan–Laventille, the Aranguez Bridge was rendered impassable after its supporting gabions were washed away. Landslides occurred along multiple sections of the Blanchisseuse Road between Matelot and Toco. Strong winds downed power lines on the island, one of which sparked a fire. Two homes were destroyed and thirty others were damaged across Trinidad while extensive flooding was reported island-wide.

Striking Grenada as a hurricane, Emily inflicted extensive damage to the already storm-battered nation. Hurricane-force winds tore roofs from homes, devastated agriculture, and worsened the nation's struggling economy. Nationwide, 2,641 homes were damaged and of which at least 120 were destroyed, leaving 167 families homeless. Of the impacted homes, 1,153 were in Saint Andrew Parish alone. Emily resulted in one fatality in Saint Andrew Parish from a landslide and significant damage in northern parts of the country, including Carriacou and Petite Martinique which had been spared from the worst effects of Ivan. A hospital in Carriacou lost its roof, forcing the relocation of patients, and many homes were damaged in Petite Martinique. Hardest hit were areas within Saint Andrew and Saint Patrick Parish Parishes. Mount Rich, located within the latter parish, saw the destruction of half its homes. A police station in Sauteurs lost its roof. Two of the main hospitals were flooded, including the one just rebuilt with assistance from Cuba after Ivan. Flooding affected communities in Saint George's, notably in Grenville. Much of the nation lost its water supply, though restoration of power quickly remedied this. The slowly recovering agricultural industry was devastated, with progress made in the wake of Ivan destroyed. Cash crops including corn, pigeon peas, and bananas were largely lost while breadfruit, nutmeg, and cocoa trees were negatively impacted. Damages in Grenada amounted to $110.4 million.

In St. Vincent and the Grenadines, various islands experienced differing degrees of damage. The most extensive occurred on Union Island where 21 homes were damaged, 17 severely. On Canouan, four homes had their roof torn off and three others had major damage. The roof of Canouan Airport was also damaged, though it continued operating normally. No structural damage occurred in St. Lucia; some debris washed ashore, however. One child was injured on St. Vincent. Losses to the banana crop were minimal.

Heavy rainfall began impacting Jamaica on July 16, with floods soon commencing in Trelawny Parish. More than 100 people required evacuation. Extensive flooding occurred in Saint Elizabeth Parish, with many roads rendered impassable or washed away altogether. Destruction of a coastal road rendered Treasure Beach inaccessible. Five people died when their vehicle was swept into a lake near Myersville. In Manchester Parish, at least 20 homes were inundated by floodwaters. Landslides were reported in eastern Jamaica, triggered by heavy rain as the storm passed south of the island. Damage in Jamaica was estimated at $65 million.

Heavy rainfall associated with Emily killed 10 people and affected 500 families in Saint-Marc, Haiti, as homes and vehicles were swept away. In Honduras, a man drowned in a river swollen by rains from Emily.

Mexico

Yucatán Peninsula
Striking the Yucatán Peninsula on July 18 as a Category 4 hurricane, widespread damage was expected from  winds; however, these winds were confined to a small area around Emily's center. Areas in Playa del Carmen, Tulum and Cozumel sustained the most severe impact. In a few instances, concrete utility poles were snapped in half by powerful wind gusts. Additionally, waves reached , resulting in some beach erosion and damage to dunes and coral reefs. Additionally,  of retaining walls sustained damage, leaving areas vulnerable to flooding from future storms.

The high winds produced by Emily caused considerable impact in Quintana Roo, especially in the municipality of Solidaridad, leaving nearly 200,000 residences without power. In terms of structural damage, 851 homes were impacted in varying degrees. Roughly  of forests and agricultural land was affected by the storm; some swathes of trees experienced defoliation. The most substantial losses associated with the hurricane stemmed from the tourism industry, with hotels experiencing 947 million pesos ($88.7 million) worth of damage. More than 12,500 rooms, nearly one-fifth of the state's available hotel infrastructure, sustained damage. Overall, damage in the state reached 1.11 billion pesos ($104.3 million).

Northeastern Mexico
Emily's second landfall as a strong Category 3 hurricane brought significant damage to the northeast coast of Mexico. In the fishing community of Laguna Madre, over 80% of the buildings were destroyed as a result of the storm surge. Several communities on the remote coast of Tamaulipas were isolated after the storm, and major coastal flooding was reported along with heavy wind damage, with numerous homes destroyed. Inland flooding was also reported in Monterrey.

Communication to the Riviera Maya area was difficult after the storm; not all cellular phones were receiving coverage to the area, land lines were down, and electricity was out. About 18,000 people in 20 low-lying communities in the state of Tamaulipas, just south of the U.S.-Mexican border, were evacuated. Including losses sustained by the oil industry, damage in Mexico amounted to 8.87 billion pesos ($834.3 million).

Texas

In southern Texas, damage was relatively minor despite the proximity of the storm. Along the coast, a storm surge of  flooded portions of Texas State Highway 100. No significant structural damage was reported, although some trees were down and over 30,000 customers lost electricity. Rainfall from the storm peaked at 5.2 inches in Mercedes, Texas. Additionally, eight tornadoes touched down in Texas as a result of Emily, damaging or destroying several homes. The remains of Emily passed farther west into Texas and delivered some rainfall, which ended a drought. Agricultural losses in Texas amounted to $4.7 million, while property losses reached $225,000.

Aftermath

Caribbean

On the day of Emily's passage, the Government of Grenada began relief supply distribution and conducted aerial damage assessments. The Ministry of Works coordinated the deployment of worker crews. Grenada informed the United Nations that they could largely handle the disaster on their own, though some international assistance would be needed. Following further assessments, the nation formally appealed for international aid on July 18. The Grenada Coast Guard assisted with the distribution of emergency supplies to Carriacou on July 15. Power was restored to much of the nation within a day of the hurricane, though some residences would remain disconnected for several days. A second night of curfew was imposed from 11:00 p.m. to 4:00 a.m. local time July 15–16. Businesses resumed normal operations on July 16.

On July 15, the IFRC launched a joint-disaster appeal of 750,000 Swiss francs (US$590,000) for relief efforts related to Hurricanes Dennis and Emily. The target goal was 35,000 people throughout Grenada, Jamaica, and Haiti. Initial relief in Grenada would be carried out by the Grenada Red Cross, with focus placed on providing shelter and psychological support. The Government of Grenada made a request for 10,000–15,000 tarpaulins, hygiene kits, jerry cans, and first aid kits to the IFRC. The Oxford Committee for Famine Relief (OXFAM) deployed to Carriacou to build pit latrines. Food for the Poor "rushed" to assist Grenadians. India provided galvanized roofing material with expected delivery in August. UNICEF provided 10,000 oral rehydration salts, 5,000 water purification tablets, 500 water containers (with a collective capacity of ), and several trauma kits.

Trinidad and Tobago did not request international assistance, indicating they could handle relief with internal resources.

The Haitian Government coordinated with the IFRC to assist victims in Saint-Marc.

Jamaica's Rapid Damage Assessment Team conducted aerial assessments on July 17 to determine the extent of flooding.

Mexico

See also

 List of Category 5 Atlantic hurricanes
 Hurricane Allen (1980)
 Hurricane Gilbert (1988)
 Hurricane Dean (2007)
 Hurricane Grace (2021)

References

External links

 The National Hurricane Center's archive on Hurricane Emily

2005 Atlantic hurricane season
Cape Verde hurricanes
Category 5 Atlantic hurricanes
Hurricanes in the Windward Islands
Hurricanes in Grenada
Hurricanes in Saint Vincent and the Grenadines
Hurricanes in Jamaica
Atlantic hurricanes in Mexico
Hurricanes in Texas
Hurricane Emily
2005 in Grenada
Tropical cyclones in 2005